Seløyna or Seløy is an island in Øygarden municipality in Vestland county, Norway.  The  island is the northernmost of the large populated islands in the Øygarden archipelago.  It is connected to the island of Alvøyna by a short bridge over the Vikesundet strait.  The small island of Førehjelmo lies just to the north of Seløyna, and there is a small bridge connecting to it.

The island was once part of the old municipality of Hjelme which existed until 1964.  The island is home to two churches: the Old Hjelme Church in the small, coastal village of Hjelmo and the "new" Hjelme Church is centrally located along the main road crossing the island of Seløyna.

See also
List of islands of Norway

References

Islands of Vestland
Øygarden